Viktor Mikheyev (Russian: Виктор Михеев; born 19 April 1942) is a Soviet coxswain from Moscow.

Mikheyev was born in Tashkent, Uzbekistan. At the 1965 European Rowing Championships in Duisburg, he won silver with the men's eight. At the 1966 World Rowing Championships in Bled, he won silver with the men's eight. At the 1967 European Rowing Championships in Vichy, he won silver with the men's eight. He competed at the 1968 Summer Olympics in Mexico City with the men's coxed four where they came sixth. At the 1970 World Rowing Championships in St. Catharines, he won a silver medal with the men's eight. At the 1971 European Rowing Championships in Copenhagen, he won bronze with the men's eight. At the 1972 Summer Olympics in Munich, he came fourth with the men's eight. Winner of the Henley Royal Regatta in the men's eight in 1972. 7-time champion of the USSR in rowing. Master of Sports of the USSR of international class.

References

1942 births
Living people
Soviet male rowers
Olympic rowers of the Soviet Union
Rowers at the 1968 Summer Olympics
Rowers at the 1972 Summer Olympics
Sportspeople from Tashkent
Coxswains (rowing)
World Rowing Championships medalists for the Soviet Union
European Rowing Championships medalists